Alexandre Pawlisiak (26 May 1913 – 15 July 1990) was a French racing cyclist. He raced in the 1947 Tour de France.

References

External links

1913 births
1990 deaths
French male cyclists
People from Recklinghausen
Sportspeople from Münster (region)